Fogolin is a surname. Notable people with the surname include:

 Lee Fogolin Sr. (1927–2000), Canadian ice hockey player
 Lee Fogolin (born 1955), American ice hockey player